Canister shot is a kind of anti-personnel artillery ammunition. Canister shot has been used since the advent of gunpowder-firing artillery in Western armies. However, canister shot saw particularly frequent use on land and at sea in the various wars of the 18th and 19th century. Canister is still used today in modern artillery.

Description 

Canister shot consists of a closed metal cylinder typically loosely filled with round lead or iron balls packed with sawdust to add more solidity and cohesion to the mass and to prevent the balls from crowding each other when the round was fired. The canister itself was usually made of tin, often dipped in a lacquer of beeswax diluted with turpentine to prevent corrosion of the metal. Iron was substituted for tin for larger-caliber guns. The ends of the canister were closed with wooden or metal disks.

A cloth cartridge bag containing the round's gunpowder used to fire the canister from the gun barrel could be attached to the back of the metal canister for smaller caliber cannon. A sabot of wood, metal, or similar material was sometimes used to help the round during firing from the cannon.

Various types of canister were devised for specific models of artillery field pieces. In 1753, the "secret howitzer", a special gun with an oval bore—intended to spread shot even wider—was briefly introduced into Russian service, but ultimately proved unsuccessful. The Royal Artillery Museum at Woolwich, London, holds examples of two early 18th century experimental French wide bore cannon—flattened tubes intended to scatter canister wide but in one horizontal plane.

The United States Army developed a canister round, the M1028, for the M1 Abrams' 120mm smoothbore gun in time for the 2003 invasion of Iraq. The effect is to turn a large-caliber gun on an armored fighting vehicle into a giant shotgun. This can be used against enemy infantry even when in proximity to friendly armoured vehicles, as the projectiles do not penetrate armour. In addition it can be used to create entry points to buildings, reduce wire obstacles and clear heavy vegetation, as well as strike low flying aircraft and helicopters.

Langrage 

At times when the supply of balls was limited, nails, scrap iron or lead, wire, and other similar metal objects were included. The projectile had been known since at least the 16th century and was known by various nicknames in the 17th century such as hailshot or partridge shot. Rounds recovered from Henry VIII's warship Mary Rose (sunk 1545) were wooden cylinders filled with broken flint flakes. When filled with rubbish or scrap (rather than round bullets) the round could be known as scrapshot or langrage. In 1718 Blackbeard aka Edward Teach armed his guns with a range of makeshift weaponry including langrage. Several of his cannons, still loaded with spikes and shot, have been recovered from the wreck site of his flagship, the Queen Anne's Revenge.  Archaeologists have also retrieved conglomerations of lead shot, nails, spikes and glass from the site. Langrage was also found among the artifact assemblage of the Mardi Gras shipwreck, 4000 ft (1219 m) deep in the Gulf of Mexico. The defenders of The Alamo (1836) used old horseshoe nails and chopped up iron horseshoes to make their scrapshot.

Effectiveness 
When fired, the canister disintegrates and its shards and projectiles spread out in a conical formation, causing a wide swath of destruction. It was particularly effective during the Napoleonic Wars and the American Civil War, where massed troops at close range (usually less than 400 yards) could be broken up by artillery batteries firing canister. At times, particularly at very close range, artillery crews would fire extremely lethal "double canister," where two rounds were loaded into the gun tube and fired simultaneously using a single charge. At the Battle of Waterloo, in 1815, Mercer's Troop, Royal Horse Artillery, fired a roundshot and a canister from each gun as a double-shot. The roundshot was loaded first with the canister on top.  Canister played a key role for Union forces during their defeat of Confederate troops assigned to support Pickett's Charge during the Battle of Gettysburg in July 1863.

At times, trained artillerists would fire the canister shot towards the ground in front of advancing enemy troops, causing the conical pattern to flatten out as the balls ricocheted and skipped off the terrain. This in effect widened the killing zone. An example of this tactic was on the first day of Gettysburg, where Lt. James Stewart's Battery B, 4th U.S. Artillery on Seminary Ridge skipped canister shot at Alfred M. Scales's approaching Confederate infantry, breaking up their attack and forcing them to take cover in a depression.

Canister shot was also used to good effect by U.S. Marine 37mm anti-tank guns in World War II to break up Japanese banzai charges.

During the Korean War United Nations tanks experienced close-range massed infantry attacks from Communist forces. As a consequence a canister-type tank round was introduced to "sweep" enemy infantry off friendly tanks without harming friendly tank crews, who were behind canister-proof armor. UK weapons known to have fielded a canister round are the 76mm and 105mm tank guns and the 120mm MOBAT and WOMBAT recoilless anti-tank guns.

Similar multi-projectile ammunition 
Shrapnel shells were developed from canister during the Napoleonic Wars and were intended to deliver the same canister effect, but at much longer ranges. As a result, its early designation was "spherical case shot". Instead of a tin can filled with metal balls, the shrapnel shells carry a small powder charge to break open the case and disperse the shrapnel.

Grapeshot was a geometric arrangement of round shot packed tightly into a canvas bag and separated from the gunpowder charge by a metal disk of full bore diameter. Grapeshot used fewer larger projectiles than were contained within canister or shrapnel shells.

Case shot broadly describes any multi-projectile artillery ammunition. The canister round is known as a case, so canister was sometimes called case shot and the term has confusingly become generic for grapeshot and shrapnel shells. However, the term case shot is also used to describe a hollow ball containing a powder charge and bullets. After firing the iron ball the powder would explode, scattering the bullets.

See also
 Beehive anti-personnel round
 Chain shot
 Heated shot
 Field artillery in the American Civil War

References

 Cole, Philip M., Civil War Artillery at Gettysburg, Da Capo Press, 2002, .

External links

"Tin Canister or Case Shot in the 18th Century" by Adrian B. Caruana
 The Civil War Artillery Projectile and Cannon Home Page—Several detailed pages on specific types of canister
 Artillery page—AmericanRevolution.ORG
 Mardi Gras Shipwreck
 

American Civil War artillery
Artillery ammunition
Projectiles